Old Road may be:

 Old Road, a town on Antigua island, Antigua and Barbuda
 Old Road, Oxford, a road in Oxford and Oxfordshire, England
 The Old Road, an alternative name for U.S. Route 99, United States
 Old Road Campus, a University of Oxford site in Oxford, England
 Old Road F.C., Antiguan football team in the Antigua and Barbuda Premier Division
 Old Road Ground, former cricket, football, and greyhound racing stadium in Clacton-on-Sea, Essex, England
 Old Road Subdivision, railroad line in Kentucky, United States
 Old Road Town, a town in Saint Kitts and Nevis

See also
 This Old Road, a 2006 album by Kris Kristofferson
 Old Street, a street in London, England, site of Old Street station and the Old Street Roundabout